The 1981 Soviet football championship was the 50th seasons of competitive football in the Soviet Union. Dinamo Kiev won the Top League championship becoming the Soviet domestic champions for the tenth time.

Honours

Notes = Number in parentheses is the times that club has won that honour. * indicates new record for competition

Soviet Union football championship

Top League

First League

Second League (finals)

 [Oct 26 – Nov 12]

Finals 1

Finals 2

Finals 3

Top goalscorers

Top League
 Ramaz Shengelia (Dinamo Tbilisi) – 23 goals

First League
Ravil Sharipov (Metallurg Zaporozhye) – 26 goals

References

External links
 1981 Soviet football championship. RSSSF